Bai Harir Sultani Stepwell is a stepwell in Asarwa area 15 km off Ahmedabad, Gujarat, India.

History

The stepwell was built in 1485 by Dhai Harir, a household lady of Mahmud Begada according to the Persian inscription in the stepwell. She was the superintendent of the royal harem.

Dhai Harir built a mosque and a tomb in which she was buried. The well bears two inscriptions, one in Sanskrit on the south, and one in Arabic on the north wall, of the first gallery.

The Arabic writing reads: 

A Sanskrit inscription says that the step-well was built in December 1499 AD. It was during the reign of Mahmud Shah that Bai Harir Sultani, locally known as Dhai Harir, built the step-well. The name later corrupted into Dada Hari. It costed 3,29,000 Mahmudis ( 3 lakh) at that time. The ornate step-well has spiral staircases pieced into the sidewall of the well shaft and descending to the different platform levels.

Structure

Built in sandstone in Solanki architectural style, the Dada Harir stepwell is five stories deep. It is octagonal (8-sided polygon) in plan at the top, built on intricately carved large number of pillars. Each floor is spacious enough to provide for people to congregate. It was dug deep to access ground water at that level, accounting for seasonal fluctuations in water level due to rainfall over the year. The air and light vents in the roofs at various floors and at the landing level are in the form of large openings. From the first story level, three staircases lead to the bottom water level of the well, which is considered a unique feature.

At the level of the ground, it is 190 feet long by forty wide. At the east end, from a domed canopy, a descent of eight steps leads to a covered gallery. A second flight of nine steps leads to another gallery, and a third of eight steps to the lowest gallery two or three foot above the level of the water. At each landing a corridor runs along the sides and leads to other galleries that cross the well at intervals.

Built along an east–west axis, entrance is from the East, the two spiral staircases are in West, near the well. The structural system is typically Indian style with traditional trabeat with horizontal beams and lintels. At the bottom of the well is a square stepped floor in the shape of a funnel extending to the lowest plane. This is chiseled into a circular well. Above the square floor, columns, beams, wall and arched openings spiral around; a feature that continues to the top. The top part of the well, however, is a vertical space open to the sky. The four corners of the square are strengthened with stone beams, set at 45 degrees angle. The motifs of flowers and graphics of Islamic architecture blend very well. The dominant carvings on the upper floors are of elephants ( in size, each of a different design).

Gallery

See also
 Mata Bhavani's Stepwell
 Amritavarshini Vav
 Adalaj Stepwell
 Jethabhai's Stepwell
 Ahmedabad

References

External links

 Dada Harir Vav
 Ranked #19 out of 121 things to do in Ahmedabad
 Dada Harir Stepwell on Gujarat Tourism Official Website
 Bad times for Dada Hari ni Vav in Gujarat

Stepwells in Gujarat
Islamic architecture
Buildings and structures completed in 1499
Buildings and structures in Ahmedabad
Tourist attractions in Ahmedabad
Monuments of National Importance in Gujarat